Robert Holley (born 1958) is an American-South Korean lawyer and television personality

Robert Holley may also refer to:

Robert M. Holley (1913–1977), American cartoonist
Robert W. Holley (1922–1993), American biochemist

See also 
Robert Halley (1796–1876), English Congregationalist minister and abolitionist